Clarence Hunter (3 February 1891 – 30 September 1930) was a cricketer from British Guiana. He played in seven first-class matches for British Guiana from 1910 to 1923, and was part of the West Indian team that toured England in 1923.

See also
 List of Guyanese representative cricketers

References

External links
 

1891 births
1930 deaths
Cricketers from British Guiana
Sportspeople from Georgetown, Guyana